The Singapore Chinese Football Club is a local football organisation in Singapore established in 1911. Initially set up to promote football amongst the Chinese  community in colonial Singapore, its focus now is to advance the interests of Singapore football, with an added emphasis on young players.

Activities
Today, the SCFC involves itself in a number of grassroots and regional activities. These include:
Participation in local football tournaments
Youth Development Academy
Veterans' Tournaments

Participation in local football tournaments
The famed SCFC Tyrwhitt Soccerites was part of the SCFC before. The SCFC Soccerites were part of the FAS Premier League, and boasted of players such as Jamie Reeves and had won many trophies.

SCFC currently plays in the National Football League in Singapore.
The team were 2008 FA Cup runners up.

The SCFC feeder team plays in the ESPZEN tournament, one of leading football tournament in Singapore. Its players are mostly made up of Chinese players. The SCFC feeder team regularly takes part in overseas friendlies. They were champions of the Dixy Cup Johor 2008, and runner-up of the same tournament in 2009.

Competitions
The Singapore Chinese Football Club has historically 
participated in major regional tournaments in this region.

Some of them are:

Football Association of Singapore – Singapore National Football League Division 3 Champions 1986
Football Association of Singapore – Singapore National U-19 Tournament 1986
Football Association of Singapore – Singapore National Football League Division 2 Champions 1987
Football Association of Singapore – Singapore Pools Premier League 1988
Football Association of Singapore – Singapore National U-17 Tournament 1988
Football Association of Singapore – Singapore National Football League Division 1 Champions 1988
Football Association of Singapore – Singapore Premier League 1989
World Chinese Football Association – 7th Evergreen Veteran Cup 1995
Football Association of Singapore – Singapore National Football League Division 3 2000
Football Association of Singapore – Singapore National Football League Division 3 Champions 2001
Football Association of Singapore – Singapore National Football League Division 2 Champions 2002
Football Association of Singapore – Singapore National Football League Division 1 2003
World Chinese Football Association – 8th Evergreen Veteran Cup 2003
World Chinese Football Association – 9th Evergreen Veteran Cup 2005
Football Association of Singapore – FICO Sports Futsal Challenge U-13 Runners up 2007
Singapore 9's Master 9-A-Side Football Tournament 2008
North East Central Children Futsal Challenge U-12 Runners up 2008
K-Line Cup Challenge U-12 Runners up 2008
K-Line Cup Challenge U-15 Runners up 2008
Singapore Soccer Coaches Malaysia Tour Challenge U-15 Champions U-15 2008
Football Association of Singapore – FICO Sports Futsal Challenge U-12 Champions 2008
Coerver Challenge Cup U-14 Champions 2008
Coerver Challenge Cup U-16 Runners up 2009
Coerver Challenge Cup U-14 Third Placing 2009
Coerver Challenge Cup U-12 Champions 2009
Coerver Challenge Cup U-10 Champions 2009
NSE Children League Tournament 2010
RSUC President Challenge Trophy 2010

Youth Development Academy
Established in February 2007, the SCFC Academy is targeted at youth of all races living in the region of Singapore. Training is conducted by Asian Football Confederation qualified coaches and ex-Singapore internationals.

The SCFC Academy maintains a unique approach towards training. Character development of its players takes equal, if not more importance than technical football skills. A strong emphasis is also placed on the players' academics. Players are known to have been barred from training if they do not do well at school, and parents are very much involved in the progress of their children in the Academy.

Unlike clubs with youth academies or centres-of-excellence, the Academy's aims are to develop their players to be good enough to represent their own schools, and not necessarily SCFC.

The Academy currently trains boys in the under-18/16/14/12/10/8 categories, with about 40 players in each senior and junior side.

Since its establishment, the Academy's players have done well, winning several local and regional tournaments. Some of their players have also gone on to play for the schools such as the Singapore Sports School or even join the S.League.

Veterans' Tournaments
The SCFC regularly send its members for friendlies and tournaments throughout the region of Asia and the Pacific. Tournaments include the annual Evergreen Cup for football veterans. The 9th Evergreen Cup was hosted by Singapore in 2005.

Affiliates
Over the years, SCFC has established relations with several football organisations in Asia and the Pacific, especially with overseas Chinese football organisations in the region.

Affiliated football organisations hail from:

Accolades
SCFC has accumulated a number of accolades from its ventures in overseas tournaments.

Community
SCFC supports the development of Singapore football in the community. In addition to the SCFC Academy, the Club also maintains a school outreach programme.

The club coaches football teams of primary and secondary schools each year. To date, the club has provided coaching for:

Seng Kang Secondary School
Punggol Secondary School
Greenwood Primary School
Woodlands Primary School

References

Chinese-Singaporean culture
Football in Singapore
Chinese Singaporean organisations